Sasuke may refer to:

In history and geography:
Sasuke Inari Shrine, a Shinto Shrine in Kamakura, Japan

In general usage:
Sarutobi Sasuke, a ninja in Japanese folklore
Sasuke (TV series), a televised sports entertainment special in Japan
The Great Sasuke or Masanori Murakawa (born 1969), Japanese professional wrestler

Music

"Sasuke" (song), a song by rapper Lil Uzi Vert

Fictional characters:
Sasuke Uchiha (うちは サスケ), a main character in the manga and anime series Naruto
Sasuke, a character in The Legend of the Mystical Ninja series media
Sasuke, a character in Ninja Nonsense media
Sasuke, the main character of the video game Ninja Master's
Sasuke or NinjaRed, one of several main characters in the Ninja Sentai Kakuranger television series
Sasuke or Sazo, a character in Mirmo! media
Sasuké, a character in the Usagi Yojimbo comic book series
Sasuke Matsutani, a character in the Legendz universe
Sasuke Sagami, a character in the manga Animal Academy: Hakobune Hakusho
Sasuke Sarugakure, a character in the Ranma ½ anime

See also
Ryūnosuke
Sansuke
Sōsuke, a masculine Japanese given name

Japanese masculine given names